APU or Apu may refer to:

Film and television
 The Apu Trilogy, a series of three Bengali films, directed by Satyajit Ray, with the fictional character Apu Roy, comprising:
 Pather Panchali (Song of the Little Road) (1955), the first of the three films, covering the early childhood of Apu
 Aparajito (The Unvanquished) (1956), the second film, covering the remaining years of Apu's youth and adolescence
 Apur Sansar (The World of Apu) (1959), the final film of the trilogy, covering Apu's adulthood
 Apu Nahasapeemapetilon, a fictional character from the animated television series The Simpsons (appearing 1990–2020)

Literature
 Apu Roy, the fictional character in two novels by Bibhutibhushan Bandyopadhyay:
Pather Panchali (1929), the basis for the first film of The Apu Trilogy
 Aparajito, a second novel by Bibhutibhushan Bandyopadhyay, the basis of the second and third films of the trilogy
 Apu (magazine), a Finnish family magazine (1933–present)

Organizations
 Aliança Povo Unido, or United People Alliance, a political coalition in Portugal
 Applied Psychology Unit, now the Cognition and Brain Sciences Unit at the Medical Research Council, United Kingdom
 Evangelical Church of the old-Prussian Union, (Evangelische Kirche der altpreußischen Union) a former church
 Amherst Political Union, a student debating organization at Amherst College

Education
 Alaska Pacific University, in Anchorage, Alaska, United States
 American Public University, in Charles Town, West Virginia, United States
 Anglia Polytechnic University, former name of Anglia Ruskin University in England
 Azusa Pacific University, in Azusa, California, United States
 Asia Pacific University of Technology & Innovation, colloquially known as Asia Pacific University, in Kuala Lumpur, Malaysia
 Ritsumeikan Asia Pacific University, in Beppu, Ōita, Japan
 Azim Premji University, in Bangalore, Karnataka, India

Technology
 AMD APU, marketing term from AMD for a microprocessor that includes a CPU and a GPU within a single chip
 Audio processing unit, a microprocessor for processing audio on computers
 Auxiliary power unit, a device on a vehicle that provides energy for functions other than propulsion

Transportation
 Apucarana Airport, Brazil, by IATA code
 Apu (1899), a Finnish icebreaker
 Apu (1970), a Finnish icebreaker, in the list of icebreakers

Other uses
 Apu, another name for Upu, an ancient region surrounding Damascus
 Apu (god), a deity or honorific in South American religion and Incan mythology
 Augusto Pinochet Ugarte, 31st President of Chile

See also
 Aşağı Apu, a village in Azerbaijan
 Yuxarı Apu, a village in Azerbaijan
 The Problem with Apu a 2017 documentary film critiquing stereotypes of people from India and the fictional character of Apu in The Simpsons